Palacherla is a village situated in East Godavari district in Rajahmundry region, in Andhra Pradesh State, India.

References

Villages in East Godavari district